The Central District of Asadabad County is a district (bakhsh) in Asadabad County, Hamadan Province, Iran. At the 2006 census, its population was 104,566, in 25,167 families.  The District has two cities: Asadabad & Ajin.  The District has six rural districts (dehestan): Chaharduli Rural District, Darbandrud Rural District, Jolgeh Rural District, Kolyai Rural District, Pirsalman Rural District, and Seyyed Jamal ol Din Rural District.

References 

Asadabad County
Districts of Hamadan Province